Spider-Man 3 is a 2007 American superhero film based on the Marvel Comics character Spider-Man. It was directed by Sam Raimi from a screenplay by Raimi, his older brother Ivan and Alvin Sargent. It is the final installment in Raimi's Spider-Man trilogy, and the sequel to Spider-Man (2002) and Spider-Man 2 (2004). The film stars Tobey Maguire as Peter Parker / Spider-Man, alongside Kirsten Dunst, James Franco, Thomas Haden Church, Topher Grace, Bryce Dallas Howard, James Cromwell, Rosemary Harris, and J. K. Simmons. The film also marks the final film appearance of Cliff Robertson before his retirement and death in 2011. Set a year after the events of Spider-Man 2, the film follows Peter Parker as he prepares for his future with Mary Jane Watson, while facing three new villains: Uncle Ben's true killer, Flint Marko, who becomes Sandman after a freak accident; Harry Osborn, his best friend, who is now aware of Peter's identity and seeks to avenge his father; and Eddie Brock, a rival photographer who subsequently transforms into Venom. Peter also faces his greatest challenge when he bonds with an extraterrestrial symbiote that increases his abilities but amplifies his anger and other negative traits.

Development of Spider-Man 3 began immediately after the successful release of Spider-Man 2 for a 2007 release. During preproduction, Raimi originally wanted two villains, Harry Osborn and Sandman. At the demand of producer Avi Arad, he added Venom to the list, and the producers also requested the addition of Gwen Stacy. Principal photography for the film began in January 2006 and took place in Los Angeles and Cleveland before moving to New York City from May until July 2006. Additional pick-up shots were made after August and the film wrapped in October 2006. During post-production, Sony Pictures Imageworks created over 900 visual effects shots. With an estimated production budget of $258–350 million, it was the most expensive film ever made at the time of its release.

Spider-Man 3 premiered on April 16, 2007, in Tokyo, and was released in the United States in both conventional and IMAX theaters on May 4, 2007. The film grossed $895 million worldwide, making it the highest-grossing film of the trilogy, the third-highest-grossing film of 2007 and was the highest-grossing Spider-Man film until it was surpassed by Spider-Man: Far From Home in 2019. Unlike the previous installments, Spider-Man 3 received mixed reviews from critics, who praised Raimi's direction, Young's musical score, the performances, action sequences and visual effects, but were divided over its story while being critical over the film's number of villains.

A fourth installment, titled Spider-Man 4, was set to be released on May 6, 2011, followed by a Venom spin-off film, along with a fifth and sixth installment, titled Spider-Man 5 and Spider-Man 6 respectively, but all were canceled. The Spider-Man film series was rebooted twice; first with The Amazing Spider-Man (2012) by Marc Webb and starring Andrew Garfield; and later a new film series set within the Marvel Cinematic Universe (MCU) directed by Jon Watts and starring Tom Holland, beginning with Spider-Man: Homecoming (2017). Spider-Man: No Way Home (2021) explored the concept of the multiverse to connect the previous films and characters to the MCU with Maguire and Church reprising their roles in the film.

Plot

Over a year and a half after the sacrifice of Otto Octavius, Peter Parker plans to propose to Mary Jane Watson, who has made her Broadway debut. In Central Park, a meteorite lands near the two, and an extraterrestrial symbiote follows Peter to his apartment. Harry Osborn, knowing Peter is Spider-Man, seeks to avenge his father's death. Using his father's performance-enhancing gas and Green Goblin technology, he battles Peter to an eventual stalemate, developing partial amnesia. Meanwhile, police pursue escaped convict Flint Marko, who visits his wife and sick daughter before fleeing. Falling into an experimental particle accelerator that fuses his body with the surrounding sand, he gains the ability to control and reform his body with sand, becoming Sandman.

During a festival honoring Spider-Man for saving Gwen Stacy's life, Peter kisses her to please the crowd, angering Mary Jane. Marko then robs an armored truck and escapes after defeating Spider-Man. NYPD Captain George Stacy, Gwen's father, informs Peter and his aunt May that Marko is uncle Ben's true killer; the deceased Dennis Carradine was Marko's accomplice. At the apartment, the symbiote assimilates Peter, who sleeps while waiting for Marko to come out of hiding. Peter awakens on top of a building, discovering that the symbiote has colored his suit black and enhanced his powers; however, it also brings out darker parts of his personality.

Peter locates Marko in a subway tunnel. In the ensuing fight, he opens a pipe, releasing water that reduces Marko to mud and washes him away in a sewer. Peter's changed demeanor alienates Mary Jane, who also receives negative reviews from critics. She shares a tender moment with Harry but leaves in regret. Urged by a hallucination of his father, Harry recovers from his amnesia and forces Mary Jane to break up with Peter. Harry later meets up with Peter and tells him that Mary Jane loves him. Under the symbiote's influence, Peter confronts Harry and spitefully claims that his father never loved him. He turns to leave after a brutal fight, and Harry throws a pumpkin bomb at him; Peter deflects it back, disfiguring Harry's face.

At the Daily Bugle, Peter exposes rival photographer Eddie Brock, whose fake photos incriminate Spider-Man. Furious at having to print a retraction, publisher J. Jonah Jameson fires Brock and promotes Peter to staff photographer. Later, Peter brings Gwen to a jazz club where Mary Jane now works. In an attempt to make her jealous, Peter interrupts Mary Jane's performance and dances with Gwen in front of her. Upon learning of Peter's real intentions, Gwen apologizes to Mary Jane and leaves. After assaulting the bouncers and accidentally hitting Mary Jane, Peter realizes that the symbiote is corrupting him. Retreating to a church's bell tower and discovering that the high-pitched sounds of clanging metal weaken the creature, Peter removes the symbiote. Brock is at the same church and becomes the symbiote's new host.

As Venom, Brock locates a still-living Marko and convinces him to join forces to kill Spider-Man. Brock abducts Mary Jane and holds her captive at a construction site, intending to kill her in revenge for Peter ruining him, while Marko keeps the police at bay. After Harry declines to help Peter, Harry's butler reveals that Norman's death was not Spider-Man's fault. While Brock and Marko pin Peter down, Harry arrives to help Peter and save Mary Jane. Brock attempts to impale Peter with Harry's glider, but Harry jumps in and is impaled instead. Remembering the symbiote's weakness, Peter assembles a perimeter of metal pipes to create a sonic attack, weakening it and allowing Peter to separate Brock from the symbiote.

Peter activates a pumpkin bomb and throws it at the hostless symbiote. Having become addicted to its influence, Brock attempts to save the symbiote, but the bomb explodes, vaporising them. Marko explains that Ben's death was an accident that has haunted him and that everything he has done was to help his daughter; Peter forgives Marko, allowing him to escape. Peter and Harry reconcile before the latter dies from his injuries. Sometime after Harry's funeral, Peter visits Mary Jane at the jazz club, where they embrace and share a dance.

Cast
 Tobey Maguire as Peter Parker / Spider-Man:A superhero, a brilliant physics student at Columbia University, and photographer for the Daily Bugle. As he grows arrogant with the city starting to embrace him for the first time in his career, an alien symbiote attaches itself to Peter's costume and influences his behavior for the worse. Maguire said he relished the opportunity to play a less timid Peter in this film.
 Kirsten Dunst as Mary Jane Watson:Peter Parker's girlfriend and a Broadway actress, whom he has loved since childhood. Mary Jane has a string of bad luck in the film, reminiscent of Peter's misfortune in Spider-Man 2, struggling in her career because of negative reviews and losing her friend when the symbiote takes him over. Mary Jane was not originally planned to be kidnapped during the climax by the villains as Raimi felt this became repetitive throughout the entire trilogy; this decision was changed late in production.
 James Franco as Harry Osborn / New Goblin:The son of Norman Osborn, and Peter Parker's best friend, who believes Spider-Man killed his father. After learning Peter is Spider-Man and that Norman was the Green Goblin, Harry picks up where his father left and becomes the New Goblin to battle his former friend directly.
 Thomas Haden Church as Flint Marko / Sandman: A small-time thug who has a ex-wife and sick daughter, for whom he steals money to help get the treatment to cure her. He transforms into the Sandman following a freak accident and incurs Peter's wrath when Peter learns he was his Uncle Ben's killer. Church was approached for Sandman because of his award-winning performance in the film Sideways, and accepted the role despite the lack of a script at the time. The film's Sandman possesses sympathy similarly exhibited by Lon Chaney Jr. in his portrayals of misunderstood creatures, as well as Frankenstein's monster, the Golem, and Andy Serkis' portrayals of Gollum and King Kong. Church worked out for 16 months to improve his physique for the role, gaining 28 pounds of muscle and losing 10 pounds of fat. On his performance, Church expressed that "[villains] with a conscience have this sad realization of who they are, and the monster they've become — there's a sense of regret. So at the end of these movies there's a dramatic resonance that really stays with the audience."
 Topher Grace as Edward "Eddie" Brock Jr. / Venom: Peter's rival at the Daily Bugle. He is exposed by Peter for creating a fake incriminating image of Spider-Man, and leaps at the opportunity to exact his revenge when he bonds with an extraterrestrial symbiote. Grace had impressed the producers with his performance in the film In Good Company. A big comic book fan who read the first Venom stories as a boy, Grace spent six months working out to prepare for the role, gaining 24 pounds of muscle. He approached the character as someone under the influence, similar to an alcoholic or drug addict, and interpreted him as having a bad childhood, which is the key difference between him and Peter. Grace found his costume unpleasant, as it had to be constantly smeared to give a liquid-like feel. The costume took an hour to put on, though prosthetics took four hours to apply. Grace also wore fangs, which bruised his gums.
 Bryce Dallas Howard as Gwen Stacy: A model and Peter's lab partner of whom Brock is attracted to. Peter asks her out to embarrass Mary Jane while possessed by the symbiote. Howard said the challenge of playing the role was in reminding many fans of the good-natured character who was Peter's first love in the comics, yet was "the other woman" in the film. Howard strove to create a sense that Gwen could potentially be a future girlfriend for him and that she "was not acting like some kind of man-stealing tart." Howard performed many of her stunts, unaware of the fact she was several months pregnant.
 James Cromwell as Captain George Stacy: Gwen's father and a New York City Police Department captain.
 Rosemary Harris as May Parker: The aunt of Peter Parker and the widow of Ben Parker, Peter's uncle. She gives Peter her engagement ring so he can propose to Mary Jane and gives him lessons in forgiveness.
 J. K. Simmons as J. Jonah Jameson: The leader of the Daily Bugle. He has a particular dislike towards Spider-Man, whom he considers a criminal and he tries with every way to discredit him.

Several actors reprise their roles from the previous films. Dylan Baker portrays Dr. Curt Connors, a college physics professor under whom Peter Parker studies, while Willem Dafoe portrays Norman Osborn / Green Goblin, Harry's late father, who returns as a hallucination to encourage his son to destroy Spider-Man, and Cliff Robertson appears as Ben Parker, Peter's deceased uncle in his final acting appearance before his retirement and death in 2011. Bill Nunn, Ted Raimi, Michael Papajohn, John Paxton, and Elizabeth Banks return as Joseph "Robbie" Robertson, a longtime employee at the Daily Bugle; Ted Hoffman, also a longtime employee of the Daily Bugle; Dennis "Spike" Carradine, the carjacker who was believed to have murdered Uncle Ben; Bernard Houseman, butler to the Osborn family; and Betty Brant, the receptionist at the Daily Bugle for J. Jonah Jameson, respectively. Elya Baskin additionally reprises his role as Mr. Ditkovitch, Peter's landlord while Mageina Tovah reprises her role as his daughter Ursula. Joe Manganiello reprises his role as Flash Thompson from the first film in a cameo appearance. Becky Ann Baker appears as Mrs. Stacy. Theresa Russell and Perla Haney-Jardine appear as Emma and Penny Marko, Sandman's wife and daughter respectively.

Spider-Man co-creator Stan Lee has a cameo in Spider-Man 3, as he did in the previous Spider-Man films, which he referred to as his "best cameo". Actor Bruce Campbell, who had cameo roles as a wrestling ring announcer in Spider-Man and as a rude usher in Spider-Man 2, returns in Spider-Man 3 with a new cameo as a French maître d'. Originally his character, who helps Peter try to propose, was much more antagonistic. Composer Christopher Young appears in the film as a pianist at Mary Jane's theater when she is fired, while producer Grant Curtis cameoed as the driver of an armored car that Sandman attacks. Comedian Dean Edwards played one of the newspaper readers who badmouth Spider-Man. 75-year-old newscaster Hal Fishman appears as himself anchoring the saga of Mary Jane's kidnapping by Venom; he died just fourteen weeks after the movie opened. Actress Lucy Gordon appeared as newscaster Jennifer Dugan.

Production

Development

In March 2004, with Spider-Man 2 being released the coming June, Sony announced that Spider-Man 3 was already in development for a release in summer 2007. By the release of Spider-Man 2, a release date for Spider-Man 3 had been set for May 2, 2007 before production on the sequel had begun. The date was later changed to May 4, 2007. In January 2005, Sony Pictures completed a seven-figure deal with screenwriter Alvin Sargent, who had penned Spider-Man 2, to script Spider-Man 3 with an option to script a fourth film.

Immediately after Spider-Man 2s release, Ivan Raimi wrote a treatment over two months, with Sam Raimi deciding to use the film to explore Peter learning that he is not a sinless vigilante, and that there also can be humanity in those he considers criminals. Harry Osborn was brought back because Raimi wanted to conclude his story line. Raimi felt that Harry would not follow his father's legacy, but be instead "somewhere between." Sandman was introduced as an antagonist, as Raimi found him a visually fascinating character. While Sandman is a petty criminal in the comics, the screenwriters created a background of the character being Uncle Ben's killer to increase Peter's guilt over his death and challenge his simplistic perception of the event. Overall, Raimi described the film as being about Peter, Mary Jane, Harry, and the Sandman, with Peter's journey being one of forgiveness.

Raimi wanted another villain, and Ben Kingsley was involved in negotiations to play the Vulture before the character was cut. Vulture was considered to be an accomplice of Flint Marko in the script. Producer Avi Arad convinced Raimi to include Venom, a character whose perceived "lack of humanity" had initially been criticized by Sam Raimi. Venom's alter-ego, Eddie Brock, already had a minor role in the script. Arad felt the series had relied too much on Raimi's personal favorite Spider-Man villains, not characters that modern fans were actually interested in, so Raimi included Venom to please them, and even began to appreciate the character himself. The film's version of the character is an amalgamation of Venom stories. Eddie Brock, Jr., the human part of Venom, serves as a mirror to Peter Parker, with both characters having similar jobs and romantic interests. Brock's actions as a journalist in Spider-Man 3 also represent contemporary themes of paparazzi and tabloid journalism. The producers also suggested adding rival love interest Gwen Stacy, filling in an "other girl" type that Raimi had already created. With so many additions, Sargent soon found his script so complex that he considered splitting it into two films, but abandoned the idea when he could not create a successful intermediate climax.

Filming
Camera crews spent 2 weeks from November 5–18, 2005 to film sequences that would involve intense visual effects so Sony Pictures Imageworks could begin work on the shots early in the project. The same steps had been taken for Spider-Man 2 to begin producing visual effects early for sequences involving the villain Doctor Octopus.

Principal photography for Spider-Man 3 began on January 16, 2006 and wrapped in July 2006 after over 100 days of filming. The team filmed in Los Angeles until May 19, 2006. In spring 2006, film location manager Peter Martorano brought camera crews to Cleveland, Ohio, due to the Greater Cleveland Film Commission offering production space at the city's convention center at no cost. In Cleveland, they shot the battle between Spider-Man and Sandman in the armored car. Afterwards, the team moved to Manhattan, where filming took place at various locations, including One Chase Manhattan Plaza, from May 26, 2006, until July 1, 2006. Shooting placed a strain on Raimi, who often had to move between several units to complete the picture. Shooting was also difficult for cinematographer Bill Pope, as the symbiote Spider-Man, Venom, and the New Goblin were costumed in black during fight scenes taking place at night.

After August, pick-ups were conducted as Raimi sought to film more action scenes. The film then wrapped in October, although additional special effects shots were taken to finalize the production a month later. In early 2007, there were further pick-up shots regarding the resolution of Sandman's story, amounting to four different versions.

Visual effects

John Dykstra, who won the Academy Award for Best Visual Effects for his work on Spider-Man 2, declined to work on the third film as visual effects supervisor. Dykstra's colleague, Scott Stokdyk, took his place as supervisor, leading two hundred programmers at Sony Pictures Imageworks. This group designed specific computer programs that did not exist when Spider-Man 3 began production, creating nine hundred visual effects shots.

In addition to the innovative visual effects for the film, Stokdyk created a miniature of a skyscraper section at 1:16 scale with New Deal Studios' Ian Hunter and David Sanger. Stokdyk chose to design the miniature instead of using computer-generated imagery so damage done to the building could be portrayed realistically and timely without guesswork involving computer models. In addition to Sony Pictures Imageworks, Cafe FX provided visual effects for the crane disaster scene when Spider-Man rescues Gwen Stacy, as well as shots in the climactic battle.
To understand the effects of sand for the Sandman, experiments were done with twelve types of sand, such as splashing, launching it at stuntmen, and pouring it over ledges. The results were mimicked on the computer to create the visual effects for Sandman. For scenes involving visual effects, Thomas Haden Church was super-imposed onto the screen, where computer-generated imagery was then applied. With sand as a possible hazard in scenes that buried actors, ground-up corn-cobs were used as a substitute instead. Because of its resemblance to the substance, sand from Arizona was used as the model for the CGI sand. In a fight where Spider-Man punches through Sandman's chest, amputee martial arts expert Baxter Humby took Tobey Maguire's place in filming the scene. Humby, whose right hand was amputated at birth, helped deliver the intended effect of punching through Sandman's chest. Producer Laura Ziskin said the visual effects budget alone was approximately 30% more than the previous film.

Whereas the symbiote suit worn in the comics by Spider-Man was a plain black affair with a large white spider on the front and back, the design was changed for the film to become a black version of Spider-Man's traditional costume, complete with webbing motif. As a consequence of this, the suit Topher Grace wore as Venom also bore the webbing motif; as producer Grant Curtis noted, "it's the Spider-Man suit, but twisted and mangled in its own right." Additionally, the motif gave a sense of life to the symbiote, giving it the appearance of gripping onto the character's body. When animating the symbiote, Raimi did not want it to resemble a spider or an octopus, and to give it a sense of character. The CGI model is made of many separate strands. When animating Venom himself, animators observed footage of big cats such as lions and cheetahs for the character's agile movements.

Deleted scenes
When interviewed at the film's Tokyo premiere on April 16, 2007, Topher Grace said to Access Hollywood that despite liking how the film turned out, he expressed interest in having the rest of his scenes as both Eddie Brock and Venom being restored someday; later adding, "You know what? Spider-Man 3.5, or however they release it. You know, with the extra scenes". Following the release of the film, fan research compiled deleted scenes and archival footage, showing Adrian Lester in the role of Dr. Wallace, a molecular biologist working on a cure for Marko's daughter, and an alternate death scene for Venom attempting to reattach itself to Parker, who in turn would have destroyed the symbiote by yanking down a sling of steel rods and creating a sonic attack (although this was depicted in the film's novelization).

Music

Danny Elfman, the composer for the previous installments, chose not to return for the third installment of Spider-Man because of difficulties with director Sam Raimi. Elfman said that he had a "miserable experience" working with Raimi on Spider-Man 2 and could not comfortably adapt his music. Christopher Young was then announced to score Spider-Man 3 in Elfman's absence. Instead, Elfman chose to work with the 2006 reboot of Charlotte's Web. A few years later, he reunited with Raimi to compose the score for the film Oz the Great and Powerful (2013).

According to Young, Sandman's theme uses "two contrabass saxophones, two contrabass clarinets, two contrabass bassoons and eight very low French horns" in order to sound "low, aggressive and heavy". Young described Venom's theme as "Vicious, my instructions on that one were that he's the devil personified. His theme is much more demonic sounding." Venom's theme uses eight French horns. Raimi approved the new themes during their first performance, but rejected the initial music to the birth of Sandman, finding it too monstrous and not tragic enough. Young had to recompose much of his score at a later stage, as the producers felt there were not enough themes from the previous films. Ultimately, new themes for the love story, Aunt May, and Mary Jane were dropped.

Marketing

On June 28, 2006, the first Spider-Man 3 teaser trailer premiered in theaters with Superman Returns. The first trailer was released in theaters on November 17, 2006 with the debut of Casino Royale and Happy Feet. This was followed by a second trailer, which was unveiled on March 9, 2007, being attached to the screenings of 300. The home video releases of Click and Monster House also contained trailers for Spider-Man 3. In New York City, the hometown of Spider-Man's fictional universe, tourist attractions arranged events and exhibits on April 30, 2007 to lead up to the release of Spider-Man 3. The unique campaign included a spider exhibit at the American Museum of Natural History, workshops on baby spider plants at the New York Botanical Garden, a Green Goblin mask-making workshop at the Children's Museum of Manhattan, and a scavenger hunt and bug show at Central Park Zoo.

Promotional tie-in partners include Burger King, 7-Eleven, General Mills, Kraft Foods, and Comcast. Hasbro, which holds the license for Marvel characters, released several toys to tie-in with the film. They include a deluxe spinning web blaster, along with several lines of action figures aimed at both children and collectors. Toys of the Green Goblin and Doctor Octopus from the first two films have been rereleased to match the smaller scale of the new figures, as have been toys of the Lizard, the Scorpion, Kraven the Hunter, and Rhino in a style reminiscent of the films. Techno Source created interactive toys, including a "hand-held Battle Tronics device that straps to the inside of a player's wrist and mimics Spidey's web-slinging motions". Japanese Medicom Toy Corporation produced collectables, which Sideshow Collectibles distributed in the U.S.  A prequel comic was released in June, 2007 and another comic called Spider-Man 3: The Black, which expands the birth of Venom, was released in November, 2007.

Release

Theatrical

Spider-Man 3 had its world premiere at Toho Cinemas Roppongi Hills in Tokyo on April 16, 2007. The film held its UK premiere on April 23, 2007 at the Odeon Leicester Square, and the U.S. premiere took place at the Tribeca Film Festival in Queens on April 30, 2007.

Spider-Man 3 was commercially released in sixteen territories on May 1, 2007. The film was released in Japan on May 1, 2007, three days prior to the American commercial release, to coincide with Japan's Golden Week. Spider-Man 3 was also released in China on May 3, 2007 to circumvent market growth of unlicensed copies of the film. The studio's release of a film in China before its domestic release was a first for Sony Pictures Releasing International. By May 6, 2007, Spider-Man 3 had opened in 107 countries around the world.

The film was commercially released in the United States on May 4, 2007 in a North American record total of 4,253 theaters, including fifty-three IMAX theaters. The record number of theaters was later beaten by Pirates of the Caribbean: At World's End, which was released in 4,362 theaters in the United States—109 more than Spider-Man 3. It was the ninth film to play in more than 4,000 theaters upon opening, just after Shrek 2, Spider-Man 2, Shark Tale, Madagascar, Mission: Impossible III, Over the Hedge, Superman Returns and Pirates of the Caribbean: Dead Man's Chest. Tracking data a month before the U.S. release reflected over 90% awareness and over 20% first choice among moviegoers, statistics that estimated an opening weekend of over $100 million for Spider-Man 3. Online tickets for Spider-Man 3 were reported on April 23, 2007 to have been purchased at a faster rate—three times at Movietickets.com and four times at Fandango—than online ticket sales for Spider-Man 2. On May 2, 2007, Fandango reported the sales rate as six times greater than the rate for Spider-Man 2. The strong ticket sales caused theaters to add 3:00 AM showings following the May 4, 2007 midnight showing to accommodate the demand.

The FX channel signed a five-year deal for the television rights to Spider-Man 3, which they began airing in 2009. The price was based on the film's box office performance, with an option for three opportunities for Sony to sell the rights to one or more other broadcast networks.

Home video
Spider-Man 3 was released on Region 4 DVD (anamorphic widescreen) in Australia on September 18, 2007. For Region 2 in the United Kingdom, the film was released on October 15, 2007. Spider-Man 3 was released on DVD in Region 1 territories on October 30, 2007. The film is available in one-disc and two-disc editions, on both standard and Blu-ray formats, as well as packages with the previous films and a PSP release. Sam Raimi, Tobey Maguire, Kirsten Dunst, James Franco, Thomas Haden Church, Topher Grace, Bryce Dallas Howard, Laura Ziskin, Avi Arad, and Grant Curtis are among those who contributed to the audio commentaries.

Sony announced plans to create "one of the largest" marketing campaigns in Hollywood for the October 30, 2007 release of the DVD. Beginning with a partnership with Papa John's, Sony printed close to 8.5 billion impressions for pizza boxes, television, radio, and online ads. Sony also worked with Pringles Potato Crisp, Blu Tack, Jolly Time Pop Corn, and Nutella. Sony's Vice President of Marketing, Jennifer Anderson, stated the studio spent approximately 15% to 25% of its marketing budget on digital ad campaigns; from this, Papa John's sent text messages to mobile phones with ads. Anderson stated that there would be three sweepstakes held for consumers, where they would be able to win prizes from Sony and its promotional partners.

It also grossed more than $43.76 million on DVD/Home Video Rentals in 11 weeks. However, the DVD sales results of this film did not meet industry expectations. It was ranked in third place on the sales chart, behind I Now Pronounce You Chuck & Larry and Ratatouille. The film's DVD sales were limited due to Sony's decision to bundle the Blu-ray version of the film with its new PlayStation 3 game console and Blu-ray player. Spider-Man 3 was included in The Spider-Man Legacy Collection which includes five major Spider-Man films in a 4K UHD Blu-Ray collection which was released on October 17, 2017.

Spider-Man 3: Editor's Cut (2017)
In 2017, Sony released an "editor's cut" of Spider-Man 3 that coincided with the film's 10th anniversary, which is included with the Spider-Man Limited Edition Blu-ray collection on June 13, 2017. The film features unused music from Christopher Young and is two minutes shorter than the theatrical cut. Some scenes are shifted around or have been completely removed, and the film includes 3 new scenes, 3 alternate climax sequences, and 1 extended scene. Spider-Man 3: Editor's Cut was later re-released with the Spider-Man Legacy Collection 4K Blu-ray Box Set.

Reception

Box office
Spider-Man 3 earned $336.5 million in North America and $558.4 million in other countries for a worldwide total of $894.9 million. Worldwide, it is the third-highest-grossing film of 2007, the highest-grossing film of Sam Raimi's Spider-Man trilogy, and was the highest-grossing film distributed by Sony/Columbia until 2012's Skyfall. The film set a worldwide single-day record ($104 million) on its first Friday and broke its own record again on Saturday ($117.6 million). It also set a worldwide opening-weekend record with $381.7 million, beating Star Wars: Episode III – Revenge of the Sith. Spider-Man 3 would hold that record until Harry Potter and the Half-Blood Prince took it in 2009. The film's IMAX screenings reached $20 million in 30 days, faster than any other 2D film remastered in the format.

In North America, Spider-Man 3 is the 58th-highest-grossing film, the third-highest-grossing film of the Spider-Man series, the third-highest-grossing film distributed by Sony/Columbia, and the highest-grossing 2007 film. The film sold an estimated 48,914,300 tickets. It was released in 4,252 theaters (about 10,300 screens) on Friday, May 4, 2007. This broke the previous record held by Shrek 2 for having the largest number of screenings. It set an opening- and single-day record with $59.8 million (both were first surpassed by The Dark Knight). This included $10 million from midnight showings. Spider-Man 3 then set an opening-weekend record with $151.1 million (first surpassed by The Dark Knight), a record for the weekend per-theater average with $35,540 per theater (first surpassed by Hannah Montana & Miley Cyrus: Best of Both Worlds Concert), and an IMAX opening-weekend record with $4.8 million (first surpassed by The Dark Knight). It would hold the record for having the highest opening weekend for any film featuring Spider-Man until it was surpassed by Captain America: Civil War less than a decade later in 2016. Then in 2022, Doctor Strange in the Multiverse of Madness dethroned Spider-Man 3 for having the largest opening weekend for a Sam Raimi film. The film set record Friday and Sunday grosses and achieved the largest cumulative gross through its second, third, and fourth day of release (all were first surpassed by The Dark Knight). It also set a record Saturday gross (surpassed by Marvel's The Avengers). When the film was released, it was ranked in first place at the box office, just ahead of Disturbia. It would also dominate films that were released during the 2007 spring season, such as Meet the Robinsons, Fracture and Blades of Glory. When Shrek the Third opened two weeks later, Spider-Man 3 dropped into second place.

Outside North America, it is the 23rd-highest-grossing film, the highest-grossing film of Sam Raimi's Spider-Man trilogy, and the third-highest-grossing film distributed by Sony/Columbia. On its opening day (Tuesday, May 1, 2007), Spider-Man 3 grossed $29.2 million from 16 territories, an 86% increase from the intake of Spider-Man 2 on its first day of release. In 10 of the 16 territories, Spider-Man 3 set new opening-day records. These territories are Japan, South Korea, Hong Kong, Thailand, Malaysia, Singapore, Taiwan, the Philippines, France, and Italy. In Germany, the film surpassed the opening day gross of Spider-Man 2. It also crushed Harry Potter and the Goblet of Fires record for scoring the biggest opening day in France, earning $6.8 million. Spider-Man 3 had the third-highest opening of any film in Austria, after The Lord of the Rings: The Two Towers and The Lord of the Rings: The Return of the King. Its Japanese opening generated a total of $3.7 million, making it the country's highest Tuesday gross of any film, breaking the former record held by Harry Potter and the Sorcerer's Stone. Meanwhile, in the UK, the film had the third-highest opening of any film in the country, trailing only behind Harry Potter and the Goblet of Fire and Pirates of the Caribbean: Dead Man's Chest. During its six-day opening weekend (through its first Sunday), the film earned $230.5 million from 107 markets, finishing #1 in all of them. Spider-Man 3 set opening-weekend records in 29 markets including Italy, China, South Korea (the latter was first surpassed by Pirates of the Caribbean: At World's End), India, Singapore, Philippines, Hong Kong, Thailand, Malaysia, Taiwan, Indonesia, Mexico, Brazil, Argentina, Colombia, and Peru. However, many of these records were achieved thanks to its six-day opening, while previous record-holders in some countries opened over the traditional three-day weekend (traditional two-, four-, or five-day weekend in other countries). In India, it grossed $16.4 million and was the seventh-highest-grossing film of 2007 there. Russia and Ukraine both earned $7.4 million from 671 screens, dethroning The Da Vinci Code. Moreover, five Asian countries had overturned a ten-year record that was held by The Lost World: Jurassic Park. As for South Korea, Spider-Man 3 crossed over The Matrix Reloaded for a local currency mark for a Hollywood release, as well as surpassing The Host. In Japan, it earned a total of $26.5 million, kicking the previous record held by The Matrix Reloaded. It was ranked in first place at the box office outside North America for three consecutive weekends.

Critical response 
The website's critics consensus reads, "Though there are more characters and plotlines, and the action sequences still dazzle, Spider-Man 3 nonetheless isn't quite as refined as the first two." Metacritic, which uses a weighted average, assigned the film a score of 59 out of 100 based on 40 critics, indicating "mixed or average reviews". Audiences polled by CinemaScore gave the film an average grade of "B+" on an A+ to F scale.

Manohla Dargis of The New York Times deplored the film's pacing as "mostly just plods" and said it lacked humor. Richard Roeper of the Chicago Sun-Times gave the film a two out of four stars, feeling, "for every slam-bang action sequence, there are far too many sluggish scenes". David Edelstein of New York magazine misses the "centrifugal threat" of Alfred Molina's character, adding that "the three villains here don't add up to one Doc Ock" (referring to Molina's portrayal of the character in Spider-Man 2). James Berardinelli felt director Sam Raimi "overreached his grasp" by allowing so many villains, specifically saying, "Venom is one bad guy too many". Roger Ebert, who gave Spider-Man 2 a glowing review, gave the sequel two out of four stars and thought Church never expressed how Sandman felt about his new powers, something Molina, as Doc Ock in Spider-Man 2, did "with a vengeance"; he said the film was "a mess," with too many villains, subplots, romantic misunderstandings, conversations and "street crowds looking high into the air and shouting 'oooh!' this way, then swiveling and shouting 'aaah!' that way". The New Yorkers Anthony Lane, who gave Spider-Man 2 a favorable review, gave the film a negative review, characterizing the film as a "shambles" which "makes the rules up as it goes along".

Roger Friedman of Fox News called the film a "4-star opera", noting that while long, there was plenty of humor and action. Andy Khouri of Comic Book Resources praised the film as "easily the most complex and deftly orchestrated superhero epic ever filmed… despite the enormous amount of characters, action and sci-fi superhero plot going on in this film, Spider-Man 3 never feels weighted down, tedious or boring". Jonathan Ross, a big fan of the comic books, felt the film was the best of the trilogy. Richard Corliss of Time commended the filmmakers for their ability to "dramatize feelings of angst and personal betrayal worthy of an Ingmar Bergman film, and then to dress them up in gaudy comic-book colors". Wesley Morris of The Boston Globe, who gave the film 4 out of 5 stars, wrote that it was a well-made, fresh film, but would leave the viewer "overfulfilled". Jonathan Dean of Total Film felt the film's complex plot helped the film's pacing, in that, "it rarely feels disjointed or loose… Spider-Man cements its shelf-life". IGN critic Todd Gilchrist felt that the film served as a satisfying conclusion to the series, and ultimately rated it with eight stars out of ten. Entertainment Weekly named the Sandman as the eighth best computer-generated film character.

John Hartl of MSNBC gave Spider-Man 3 a positive review, but stated that it has some flaws such as having "too many storylines". His opinion is echoed by Houston Chronicles Amy Biancolli who complained that "the script is busy with so many supporting characters and plot detours that the series' charming idiosyncrasy is sometimes lost in the noise". Jack Matthews of Daily News thought the film was too devoted to the "quiet conversations" of Peter and Mary Jane, but that fans would not be disappointed by the action. Finally, Sean Burns of Philadelphia Weekly felt that the director "substituted scope and scale for the warmth and wit that made those two previous pictures so memorable".

Legacy 
Raimi himself would later call the film "awful" during a 2014 interview. In 2018, Avi Arad accepted responsibility for pushing Raimi to include Venom in the film, and how the end result had disappointed many fans of the character, saying "I think we learned that Venom is not a sideshow. In all fairness, I'll take the guilt because of what Sam Raimi used to say in all of these interviews feeling guilty that I forced him into it". In 2021, Raimi acknowledged that the negative internet reaction to Spider-Man 3 at the time felt "awful" and had been difficult for him to take, but when his agent told him that he was being considered by Marvel Studios to direct Doctor Strange in the Multiverse of Madness (2022), he wondered if he could do another superhero film but ultimately decided to direct the film.

Following its initial mixed reception, Spider-Man 3 has gained widespread meme popularity on social media, becoming the subject of some fan reappraisal as well. Peter Parker's corrupted personality under the Venom symbiote has been nicknamed "Bully Maguire" or "Emo Peter Parker" and has helped increase the popularity of the film among the millennial and Gen-Z generations. The character's strutting the streets during the film's climatic montage scene was used as an option content on Destiny 2. 

Screen Rant cited Sandman (along with Doctor Octopus), as the best villain of the trilogy, while The Washington Post ranked him the sixth best villain of all the live-action Spider-Man films.
Em Casalena of Screen Rant reassessed it as the fifth most underrated superhero film ever made. MovieWeb cited it the best film that Sam Raimi directed, while Paste Magazine ranked it the 63rd best superhero movie of all time.

Accolades

Both the 35th Annie Awards and 61st British Academy Film Awards gave this movie one nomination, the former for Best Animated Effects and the latter for Best Special Visual Effects. Spider-Man 3 did not win any of the four Visual Effects Society Awards nominations it received. Dunst's and Maguire's performances earned them each one nomination from the National Movie Awards. She also received another nomination for Favorite Movie Actress from the 2008 Kids' Choice Awards ceremony. The movie fared better at the Teen Choice Awards, amounting a total of seven nominations, varying from Choice Movie Villain (for Grace) to Choice Movie Dance (for Maguire) and Choice Movie Liplock (shared between Maguire and Dunst).

Future

Cancelled sequels

In 2007, Spider-Man 4 entered development, with Raimi attached to direct and Maguire, Dunst and other cast members set to reprise their roles. Both a fourth and a fifth film were planned and at one time the idea of shooting the two sequels concurrently was under consideration. Raimi said in March 2009 that only the fourth film was in development at that time and that if there were fifth and sixth films, those two films would actually be a continuation of each other. James Vanderbilt was hired in October 2007 to pen the screenplay after initial reports in January 2007 that Sony Pictures was in contact with David Koepp, who wrote the first Spider-Man film. The script was subsequently rewritten by Pulitzer-winning playwright David Lindsay-Abaire in November 2008 and rewritten again by Gary Ross in October 2009. Sony also engaged Vanderbilt to write scripts for Spider-Man 5 and Spider-Man 6.

In 2007, Raimi expressed interest in portraying the transformation of Dr. Curt Connors into his villainous alter-ego, the Lizard, a villain which had been teased since Spider-Man 2; the character's actor Dylan Baker and producer Grant Curtis were also enthusiastic about the idea. By December 2009, John Malkovich was in negotiations to play Vulture and Anne Hathaway would play Felicia Hardy, though she would not have transformed into the Black Cat as in the comics but a new superpowered figure, the Vulturess. Raimi later clarified in a 2013 interview that Hathaway would have portrayed Black Cat if Spider-Man 4 had been made.

Sony Pictures announced in January 2010 that plans for Spider-Man 4 had been canceled due to Raimi's withdrawal from the project. Raimi reportedly ended his participation due to his doubt that he could meet the planned May 6, 2011 release date while at the same time upholding the film creatively. Raimi purportedly went through four iterations of the script with different screenwriters and still "hated it".

Following the appearance of Tobey Maguire's Peter Parker in Spider-Man: No Way Home, a fan campaign has been trending on Twitter  under the name #MakeRaimiSpiderMan4, calling for Sony to make a fourth film in the Spider-Man series directed by Sam Raimi with Tobey Maguire and Kirsten Dunst.  Raimi later expressed interest in doing so in April 2022, noting that another sequel to his Spider-Man trilogy was possible after the introduction of the Multiverse in Spider-Man: No Way Home and his MCU film Doctor Strange in the Multiverse of Madness (2022). He stated the next month that he had no plans to direct Spider-Man 4, but would do so if offered the opportunity to direct a story he approved of.

Reboot and unproduced films

A reboot of the series titled The Amazing Spider-Man was released on July 4, 2012, with Andrew Garfield as Peter Parker. A sequel, The Amazing Spider-Man 2, was released on May 2, 2014.

Following the 2014 Sony Pictures hack, leaked information from the hack indicated that prior to the cancellation of future The Amazing Spider-Man films, Sony was in talks with Sam Raimi about having him direct Spider-Man vs. The Amazing Spider-Man, a multiversal crossover film featuring Garfield's Spider-Man encounter Tobey Maguire's Spider-Man (with Maguire reprising his role), as well as a new film trilogy starring Maguire (following Garfield's firing) as a middle-aged Spider-Man years after the events of Spider-Man 3; these plans were ultimately scrapped in favor of a Marvel Studios-produced reboot set in the Marvel Cinematic Universe (MCU), beginning with Captain America: Civil War (2016), with Tom Holland cast as Spider-Man.

In a 2014 Wall Street Journal article, it was revealed that prior to Sony's 2015 decision to integrate the character of Spider-Man into the Marvel Cinematic Universe, the studio considered a concept for a crossover film between Raimi's and Marc Webb's films, tentatively titled Spider-Man vs. The Amazing Spider-Man in which Tobey Maguire and Andrew Garfield would have reprised their roles as their respective iterations of Spider-Man. Raimi was reportedly the first choice to direct, but the project did not get past the early development stage with no public announcements on the project ever made. Sony also reportedly considered inviting Raimi to do another solo trilogy with Tobey Maguire following the critically lukewarm reception and financial underperformance of The Amazing Spider-Man 2 (2014), but the project was eventually scrapped.

Sam Raimi directed the Marvel Studios film Doctor Strange in the Multiverse of Madness (2022) which sparked interest into making his unproduced Spider-Man 4 a reality. However, details and confirmations of this reprisal currently remains unknown.

Marvel Cinematic Universe

Following the underwhelming critical and commercial reception of The Amazing Spider-Man 2, Sony and Marvel Studios announced in February 2015 that a new iteration of Spider-Man would appear in the Marvel Cinematic Universe, with the character appearing in Captain America: Civil War. As part of the agreement, Sony Pictures continued to finance, distribute, own and have final creative control of the Spider-Man films. Marvel Studios and Sony will explore opportunities to integrate other characters of the MCU into future Spider-Man films. Sony released a standalone film titled Spider-Man: Homecoming, produced by Kevin Feige and Amy Pascal, on July 7, 2017 with Tom Holland starring as the new Spider-Man.

Spider-Man: No Way Home (2021) continues the story arc of the MCU's iteration of Spider-Man in addition to using the multiverse to link the Marvel Studios films with Sony Pictures' preceding Spider-Man film franchises from Sam Raimi and Marc Webb. Maguire, Dafoe and Church all reprised their respective roles as Peter Parker / Spider-Man, Norman Osborn / Green Goblin and Flint Marko / Sandman from Spider-Man 3, appearing in supporting roles alongside other actors from previous films based on the characters outside the MCU's cast, including the Sam Raimi trilogy's version of Otto Octavius / Doctor Octopus from Spider-Man 2, reprised by Alfred Molina. They are joined by Andrew Garfield, Jamie Foxx and Rhys Ifans, who reprise their respective roles as Peter Parker / Spider-Man, Maxwell Dillon / Electro and Curt Connors / Lizard from Webb's The Amazing Spider-Man films.

Notes

References

Further reading

External links

 
 

2007 films
2007 action films
2000s English-language films
2000s superhero films
2000s American films
American action films
American sequel films
Columbia Pictures films
Films scored by Christopher Young
Films about amnesia
American films about revenge
Films about extraterrestrial life
Films directed by Sam Raimi
Films partially in color
Films produced by Avi Arad
Films set in New York City
Films set in Columbia University
Films shot in Cleveland
Films shot in Los Angeles
Films shot in New York City
IMAX films
Spider-Man films
Films with screenplays by Alvin Sargent
Films with screenplays by Ivan Raimi
Films with screenplays by Sam Raimi
Film and television memes
Internet memes
Internet memes introduced in 2007
Spider-Man (2002 film series)
Superhero drama films
Green Goblin
Live-action films based on Marvel Comics